The 1872 Illinois gubernatorial election was the fifteenth election for this office.  Republican nominee, Former Governor Richard J. Oglesby defeated the Democratic and Liberal Republican nominee Gustavus Koerner.  B. G. Wright represented Independent Democrats unwilling to ally with Liberal Republicans.  Oglesby had agreed to run for the Governorship but to resign upon being elected so that Lt. Governor John Lourie Beveridge could assume the office.  Oglesby was in turn appointed to the U.S. Senate.

At this time in Illinois history, the Lieutenant Governor was elected on a separate ballot from the governor. This would remain so until the 1970 constitution.

Results

References
Our Campaigns – Illinois Governor Race – Nov 5, 1872
Stringer, Lawrence B. History of Logan County, Illinois, a Record of Its Settlement, Organization, Progress, and Achievement. Chicago, Pioneer Publishing Company: 1911. p. 292

Gubernatorial
1872
Illinois
Illinois gubernatorial election